Cryphalini is a tribe of true weevils in the subfamily Scolytinae, the bark beetles.

Genera 
Acorthylus – Allernoporus – Coriacephilus – Cosmoderes – Cryphalogenes – Cryphalus – Cryptocarenus – Eidophelus – Ernocladius – Ernoporicus – Ernoporus – Hemicryphalus – Hypocryphalus – Hypothenemus – Margadillius – Neocryphus – Periocryphalus – Procryphalus – Ptilopodius – Scolytogenes – Stegomerus – Stephanopodius – Trischidias – Trypophloeus

References

External links 
 
 
 
 Cryphalini at insectoid.info

Polyphaga tribes
Scolytinae